Kuhsar; formerly two independent villages, Chendar (Persian: چِندارو also Romanized as Chendār and Chandār), and Qal'e Soleimankhani (Persian: قلعه سلیمانخانی) is a city in Chendar District of Savojbolagh County, Alborz province, Iran. At the 2006 census, its population was 7,757, in 2,075 households. At the time of the latest census of 2016, the population had risen to 10,940 in 3,321 households.

References 

Savojbolagh County

Cities in Alborz Province

Populated places in Alborz Province

Populated places in Savojbolagh County